Richard Smeaton White (March 17, 1865 – December 17, 1936) was a Canadian newspaper publisher and political figure. He sat for Inkerman division in the  Senate of Canada as a Conservative from 1917 to 1936.

He was born in Hamilton, Ontario in 1865, the son of Richard White and Jean Riddel, and was educated in Montreal and at Bishop's College. He was publisher of the Montreal Gazette and editor from 1886 to 1896.  White was also director of Stelco, the International Paper Company, the Anglo-American Paper Company and the Montreal Trust Company. He never married.

White died in office in 1936 in Montreal.

The town of Smeaton, Saskatchewan was named after him.

References

See also 
List of Bishop's College School alumni

1865 births
1936 deaths
Politicians from Hamilton, Ontario
Anglophone Quebec people
Bishop's College School alumni
19th-century Canadian newspaper publishers (people)
Montreal Gazette publishers (people)
Canadian senators from Quebec
Conservative Party of Canada (1867–1942) senators